is a butterfly swimmer from Japan. He won gold medals at the 2001 Summer Universiade.

Personal bests 
In long course swim pools Kawamoto's bests are

Japanese Record Holder of 100m Butterfly at 51.00

14 times Asian and Japanese records.

2 times World Cup champion of butterfly.(2006,2010)* 50m butterfly: 23.46 (October 25, 2009 LCM)
 100m butterfly: 51.00 Asian, Japanese Record (September 11, 2009 LCM)

References
 Profile

External links 
 
 KOUHEI KAWAMOTO OFFICIAL WEB SITE 

1979 births
Living people
Japanese male butterfly swimmers
Sportspeople from Niigata Prefecture
Asian Games medalists in swimming
Swimmers at the 2002 Asian Games
Universiade medalists in swimming
Asian Games silver medalists for Japan
Medalists at the 2002 Asian Games
Universiade gold medalists for Japan
Medalists at the 2001 Summer Universiade
21st-century Japanese people